Diego Ignacio González Reyes (born 16 January 1991) is a Chilean footballer that currently plays for Deportes Copiapó in the Primera B de Chile.

External links
 Diego González at Football Lineups
 

1991 births
Living people
Chilean footballers
Association football midfielders
O'Higgins F.C. footballers
Chilean Primera División players